José Olivarez is an author, poet and educator from Calumet City, Illinois, U.S. His first full collection of poetry is Citizen Illegal (2018), published by Haymarket Books. Citizen Illegal was shortlisted for the $75,000 2019 PEN/Jean Stein Book Award.

Education and early life 
Jose Olivarez is the son of Mexican immigrants, and he graduated from Harvard University.

Career and writing 
Olivarez's work has been featured in the New York Times, the Paris Review, and Poetry Magazine, among others. In 2014, he co-authored the collection Home Court. Haymarket Books published his first full collection, Citizen Illegal, in 2018. Citizen Illegal was shortlisted for the $75,000 2019 PEN/Jean Stein Book Award. He is co-editor, along with Willie Perdomo and Felicia Chavez, of the forthcoming anthology The Breakbeat Poets Vol. 4: LatiNext.

He has received fellowships from several organizations, including a 2016 Poets House Emerging Poets Fellowship and a 2019 Ruth Lilly and Dorothy Sargent Rosenberg Fellowship from the Poetry Foundation.

Olivarez worked for the writing and education organizations Urban Word in New York and Young Chicago Authors, which produces the youth poetry festival, Louder than a Bomb. Olivarez co-hosts the podcast The Poetry Gods.

Works
 Citizen Illegal, Haymarket Books, 2018 
The Breakbeat Poets Vol. 4: LatiNext, Haymarket Books, 2020

References

External links

José Olivarez 
Citizen Illegal

Poets from Illinois
Writers from Chicago
Living people
Year of birth missing (living people)
Harvard University alumni
American poets of Mexican descent
American male poets
21st-century American poets
21st-century American male writers
People from Calumet City, Illinois